The Golden Volcano is a novel by Jules Verne, edited by his son Michel Verne, and published posthumously in 1906.

The story takes place in the middle of the Gold Rush, and features two French-Canadian cousins, who inherit a mining claim on the shores of the Klondike.

Plot
Two Canadians, Summy Skim and Ben Raddle, are unexpectedly bequeathed a mining claim in the Klondike. They encounter many things such as disaster, disease, and extreme weather. On the way back to Montreal, where the two cousins reside, Ben Raddle and Summy Skim are trapped in a large flood that floods the entire Klondike. Ben has a disease and a broken leg, and needs to be taken to the hospital to be seen by the trustful Dr. Pilcox. Summy Skim and their guide, Bill Steel, bring the unfortunate man to the hospital, where he is healed a few months later.

On the way out to a hunt, Summy Skim, Bill Steel, and the trusted Indian, Neluto, discover a man, torn apart, and lying under a tree. They come to the man's rescue, and bring him back to the hospital, where he dies a few days later. Before he dies, the man tells Ben Raddle and Summy Skim of a volcano of pure gold named the "Golden Mount". The cousins and their guides then get a caravan together to return to the Golden Mount. While out on a hunt, Summy Skim and Neluto discover the two villains and their caravan, plotting to take over the volcano.

Summy Skim and Neluto return to camp, where they tell the others, and a plan is formulated. Ben Raddle plans to force the volcano to erupt by emptying the river into a hole he will dig into the volcano. The plan succeeds; the villains, having made their way to the top of the mountain, are immediately forced down by the eruption. Summy Skim shoots the Texans, Hunter and Malone, the leader of the villains. The volcano erupts into the sea, causing Summy Skim and Ben Raddle to leave with less money than they came with.

History
The novel was written by Jules Verne in 1899. A revised version, by his son, Michel, was published in 1906. Thanks to Piero Gondolo della Riva, an unaltered version, using the original manuscript, was published in 1989 by the Société Jules-Verne.

Circumstances of the book's creation
In 1886, after the death of Pierre-Jules Hetzel, Verne was partially freed from the constraints that had previously been imposed on the content of his novels (both scientific and geographical). He took advantage of this new freedom to create more original novels with a more satirical or philosophical tone. In 1896, the shores of the Klondike were inundated with gold seekers. Verne could not help but be attracted to this development, especially since his own son was involved in prospecting. However, Verne did not carry this same thirst for gold in his heart, believing instead that it was the cause of civilization's decline. This thesis is evoked by Verne in some of his other novels, including The Survivors of the "Jonathan", The Chase of the Golden Meteor, and The Castaways of the Flag; the novel is thus his critique of what he sees as the plague of greed.

Characters

Characters in the original manuscript 
 Summy Skim, French-Canadian, 32 years old; a landowner and skilled hunter
 Ben Raddle, Summy Skim's first cousin, 34 years old; an engineer
 Josias Lacoste, uncle of Summy Skim and Ben Raddle; an adventurer and prospector, he left them a claim in the Klondike when he died
 Mr. Snubbin, a notary in Montreal; Canadian by birth.
 Captain Healy, president of the Anglo-American syndicate Transportation and Trading Co. in Dawson City
 Hunter, a rough-looking, half-American, half-Spanish adventurer from Texas
 Malone, Hunter's companion, with a similar look and background to him
 Boyen, a Norwegian prospector from Christiana; a peaceful man 
 Sister Martha, of the Congregation of the Sisters of Mercy; of French-Canadian origin; 32 years old
 Sister Madeleine, her companion; of the same order and origin; 20 years old.
 Bill Stell, Canadian, former scout and scout for the Dominion troops; now a convoy man and leader of an experienced staff; 50 years old
 Néluto, a member of Bill Stell's staff, pilot, Klondike Indian, age 40; previously served as a guide to Hudson's Bay Company fur traders
 Doctor Pilcox, Anglo-Canadian, about 40 years old; physician, surgeon, apothecary, and dentist of Dawson City
 William Broll, deputy director of the Anglo-American syndicate Transportation and Trading Co.
 Major James Walsh, Commissioner General of the Yukon Territories; about 50 years old
 Lorique, foreman in the service of Josias Lacoste and then of Ben Raddle; French-Canadian, about 40 years old
 Jacques Laurier, French prospector, 42 years old, born in Nantes; found half-dead by Summy Skim, but before he dies, he gives Ben Raddle the location of the "Golden Mount"
 Harry Brown, Anglo-Canadian prospector and partner of Jacques Laurier
 Krasak, an Alaskan Indian, about 40 years old, with a fierce face; Hunter and Malone's cellmate
 Stop, Summy Skim's dog
 The chief agent of Fort McPherson

Characters added by Michel Verne
 Jane Edgerton, 22 years old, prospector
 Edith Edgerton, 22 years old; Jane's first cousin
 Patrick Richardson, Irish blacksmith; six feet tall, but crazy. Jane Edgerton takes him into her service.

Also:
 Néluto, the ever-perceptive Indian in the original manuscript, gives evasive answers in this version
 Jacques Laurier, the French prospector, is renamed Ledun for no apparent reason

The Great North
Without imitating the work of Jack London to describe the beauty and the harshness of the Great North, Verne succeeds in making the reader shiver for the great outdoors. How can one survive the snowstorms of Dawson City or the crossing of the Chilkoot Pass? "It was not uncommon to see some poor emigrant, killed by cold and fatigue, abandoned under the trees..." The cities of the Great North are described with all the precision that Verne is known for. What a perfume of adventure in these bear attacks or these moose hunts!

Forces of nature
In this novel, as in Five Weeks in a Balloon, Captain Grant's Children, and The Mysterious Island, the reader discovers Verne's fascination for extreme natural phenomena. It is two cataclysms that crush the hopes of the two cousins: the earthquake in Forty Miles Creek and the explosion of the Golden Volcano. It is remarkable that these two manifestations of nature intervene at the exact moment when the two heroes are determined to come to blows (and arms) with rival prospectors – perfect examples of how wealth can corrupt humanity, as if nature made itself an arbiter and decided to send the protagonists home, punishing the wicked and chastising the innocent.

Michel Verne's changes
The dark character of the novel and its unequivocal condemnation of the thirst for gold make it a work that stands out very clearly from most of the others in Verne's Amazing Journeys series. It is highly probable that Verne would not have been able to publish this work during his lifetime, which was contrary to what the public expected of him. Michel Verne's softening of the novel thus allowed its publication. In Michel Verne's version, the two nuns become two prospector cousins, and the whole thing ends in a double wedding. A lighter character is created in the cousins' servant, while the taciturn expert, Néluto, now more of a negative caricature of Indians, loses his dignity. Finally, a more serious twist is made in Jules Verne' message: the heroes do not return from this journey completely empty-handed, and this means, perhaps, that the reviled metal (gold) is not quite as awful as it seems. It is therefore fortunate that the Société Jules-Verne was able to recover this almost-complete original manuscript of Jules Verne's work.

Notes

Novels by Jules Verne
1906 French novels
Novels set in Yukon
Klondike Gold Rush in fiction